Asghar Parsa (1919-2007) was a prominent member of Iran's National Front.

After graduating from Tehran University's School of Law, he served in the Ministry of Foreign Affairs. He was elected to Majlis from Khoy in 1951. He sided with Mohammed Mosaddeq and was arrested after the 1953 Iranian coup d'état of August 19.

In 1960, he was the spokesperson of the National Front, before being imprisoned again in 1962.

After the 1979 Iranian Revolution, he was Editor-in-Chief of the National Front's newspaper. He was imprisoned again for more than three years by the government.

He died February 2007 in Tehran.

External links
  Webpage

University of Tehran alumni
People from Khoy
1919 births
2007 deaths
National Front (Iran) MPs
Members of the 17th Iranian Majlis
Iran Party politicians
Deputies of Khoy and Chaypareh